I Am Alive and You Are Dead is the debut album by Orphans & Vandals, released on 27 April 2009 in the UK. The name is a quotation from Philip K. Dick's novel Ubik.

Track listing
 "Strays"
 "Mysterious Skin"
 "Argyle Square"
 "Liquor on Sunday"
 "Incognito"
 "Metropes"
 "Christopher"
 "Terra Firma"
 "Head on with Tears"

References

2009 albums
Orphans & Vandals albums